Sally Lindquist Hudson is an economist and state legislator in Virginia. Elected in 2019, she is the first woman to represent the 57th district in the Virginia House of Delegates. She is a member of the Democratic Party. The district includes all of the city of Charlottesville and portions of nearby Albemarle County.

Early life
Hudson grew up in Lincoln, Nebraska. She studied economics and math at Stanford University, and received her PhD in economics from MIT.

Career
After earning her Ph.D., Hudson joined the faculty at the Batten School of the University of Virginia as an Assistant Professor of Public Policy, Education, and Economics. Her research focuses on public sector labor economics and higher education finance.

Political career

2019
In the 2019 Virginia House of Delegates election, Hudson challenged incumbent Democrat David Toscano, the former house minority leader. However, Toscano announced his retirement and did not run for reelection. Instead, Hudson faced architect Kathleen Galvin in the primaries. Hudson won with 65.5% of the vote.

Hudson ran unopposed in the general election, and won with 96.1% of the vote.

As a freshman legislator in 2020, Hudson successfully carried legislation to authorize the use of ranked-choice voting in Virginia's local elections.

2023
On November 21, 2022, Hudson announced a run for the 11th District of the Senate of Virginia.

References

Living people
Democratic Party members of the Virginia House of Delegates
21st-century American politicians
Women state legislators in Virginia
Stanford University alumni
MIT School of Humanities, Arts, and Social Sciences alumni
University of Virginia faculty
People from Iowa City, Iowa
Politicians from Charlottesville, Virginia
21st-century American women politicians
American women academics
1988 births